William Gunning (1864 - 16 November 1895) was an Irish Gaelic footballer. His championship career with the Limerick senior team lasted three seasons from 1887 until 1889.

Gunning first played competitive Gaelic football with the Commercials club, winning three successive county senior championship medals between 1887 and 1889.

Gunning made his inter-county debut during the 1887 championship when the Commercials club represented Limerick in the inaugural championship. He won his sole All-Ireland medal that year as Limerick defeated Louth in the final.

Gunning died from typhoid fever on 16 November 1895.

Honours

Commercials
Limerick Senior Football Championship (3): 1887, 1888, 1889

Limerick
All-Ireland Senior Football Championship (1): 1887

References

1864 births
1895 deaths
Commercials (Limerick) Gaelic footballers
Deaths from typhoid fever
Irish grocers
Limerick inter-county Gaelic footballers